Whitesand Lake is a lake in Thunder Bay District, Ontario, Canada. The primary inflow and outflow is the Whitesand River.

A second lake in Thunder Bay District with the same name, Whitesand Lake (Hewitson River), is further southeast and is on the Hewitson River system.

References

Lakes of Thunder Bay District